Hans-Georg Wilhelm von Doering (7 April 1866 – 19 November 1921) was a German officer and the last colonial governor of German Togoland before surrendering the position during the Togoland campaign of the African theatre of World War I.

Biography
Hans was born on April 7, 1866, at Königsberg as the son of Prussian Colonel Gustav Magnus Alexander von Doering (September 13, 1830 in Luxembourg, † March 19, 1896 in Oeynhausen) and his wife Hedwig, née Boie (September 25, 1832 in Danzig, † December 8 1909 in Oeynhausen) and grandson of the Lieutenant General  (1791–1866).

After serving in the cadet corps, von Doering joined the Prussian Army in 1886 as a second lieutenant in the 98th Infantry Regiment, and was seconded to the Federal Foreign Office in 1893. He was then sent to Bismarckburg, Togo, of which he became head of the research station. From there he undertook several colonial expeditions to explore, map and develop the hinterland. Von Doering helped expand German rule over Bassari and carried out a railway exploration on the Volta River. In 1894 he established a government station in Kete Krachi. From August 1896 to December 1897 he was temporarily reassigned to Prussia; serving in the 63rd Infantry Regiment. Among other positions, he was district captain of Atakpame. In September 1900, Doering was promoted to captain and in November 1911 to major. In 1908 Doering had a daughter, Luise Doering, with a local woman in Togo.

In October 1911, having served in the 38th Infantry Regiment, he retired from active military service and became a councillor and government official in Togoland on November 6, 1911. Due to his quick temper, von Doering is said to have been nicknamed Dragon by his subordinates. Peter Sebald characterized Doering as one of "the most notorious colonialists in Togo".

By August 1914, when World War I broke out, he was deputy to the governor Duke Adolf Friedrich of Mecklenburg. With the latter being on leave, von Doering commanded the brief defense and subsequent handover of the colony to Anglo-French forces. His proposal to treat Togo as a neutral territory for the duration of the war was not approved. Von Doering spent three and a half years in French captivity and was then interned in Switzerland from March to November 1918.

Returning to Germany, he was married on August 19, 1919, in Berlin to Elsbeth Gertrud Bertha von dem Bussche, née Schramm (* March 24, 1882 in Bromberg; † November 11, 1936).

Von Doering died in Bochum in 1921 as a result of smoke inhalation.

Legacy
During the Nazi era, the Reich Labour Service Detachment 8/254 bore the "honorary name" Hans Georg von Doering. This emerged from a unit of the Voluntary Labor Service in Bochum, the place where Doering died.

References

External links
 Doering, Hans Georg v., in: Heinrich Schnee (Hrsg.): Deutsches Kolonial-Lexikon, Volume 1, Quelle & Meyer, Leipzig 1920, p. 470.P20 Döring, Hans Georg von; 1866-1921: G. von Döring {verstorben} (Deutsche Allgemeine Zeitung, 1921-11-29), S. 1
 

1866 births
1921 deaths
Togoland
Military personnel from Königsberg
People from East Prussia
Prussian Army personnel
Schutztruppe personnel
German military personnel of World War I